Sir George Whitmore, K.C.H. (12 May 1775, Lower Slaughter – 19 November 1862, Amiens) was a British Army officer.

Life
He was the son of George Whitmore (1739–1794) and Mary Walls (1744 – 11 March 1808). He entered Woolwich Academy at the age of 14, and had an army commission at age 18.

Whitmore headed the Royal Engineers detachment on Malta as its Colonel Commandant between 1811 and 1829.  There he became a great friend of the governor Sir Thomas Maitland and designed the military hospital at the Villa Bighi in conjunction with Vice Admiral Sir Pulteney Malcolm.  When Sir Thomas Maitland was high commissioner of the Ionian Islands, he designed the Palace of St. Michael and St. George in Corfu City. He later became a major general and was lieutenant-governor of the Woolwich Academy between 1840 and 1846.

Family
Whitmore married Cordelia Ainslie (1780 – 19 December 1857) on 16 January 1798.  Their second daughter Cordelia Winifreda married Captain Montagu Stopford, RN, on 25 August 1827. Their grandson, Sir George Stoddart Whitmore (1829–1903), was born on Malta to Lieutenant (later Major) George St Vincent Whitmore RE and to the chief justice of Malta, Sir John Stoddart's, daughter.  He later became an army officer and police officer in New Zealand.

Works 
 The General: Travel Memoirs

Notes

External links 
 Villa Bighi
 Family history

1775 births
1862 deaths
19th century in Malta
British Army generals
People from Cotswold District
Royal Engineers officers
Architecture of Corfu
19th-century British Army personnel